Robert Schwentke (born 15 February 1968) is a German film director and screenwriter.

Life and career
Schwentke was born in Stuttgart, West Germany. He graduated from Los Angeles film school, Columbia College Hollywood (CCH), in 1992. His wife is an American.

He directed two feature films in Germany, the thriller Tattoo and the comedy Eierdiebe, the latter a semi-autobiographical film about a man being treated for testicular cancer, a disease he had been diagnosed with and survived himself in 1995.

Although not intending to do Hollywood movies, he ended up doing so after having trouble financing a third German film.

Schwentke directed 2009's The Time Traveler's Wife, based on the best-selling novel, and starring Eric Bana and Rachel McAdams. That same year, Schwentke directed the pilot episode of Fox's Lie to Me.

In 2008, Summit Entertainment optioned Red, the 2003 graphic novel thriller by writer Warren Ellis and artist Cully Hamner, as a feature film. Schwentke directed the film, Red, from a script by Whiteout screenwriters Erich and Jon Hoeber, and the adaptation was produced by Lorenzo di Bonaventura and Mark Vahradian of Transformers.  Principal photography began in January 2010 in Toronto and Louisiana with stars Bruce Willis and Morgan Freeman.

Schwentke directed the action-comedy crime film R.I.P.D., based on the comic book Rest in Peace Department by Peter M. Lenkov. The film starred Ryan Reynolds as Nick Walker and Jeff Bridges as Roycephus Pulsipher. R.I.P.D. was released on July 19, 2013 in the United States by Universal Pictures. Schwentke said in 2018 that he regretted making R.I.P.D. due to differences with the studio and that he had never watched the final film, saying it "wasn't in the end what the studio wanted". He directed The Divergent Series: Insurgent, the sequel to Divergent, which was released on March 20, 2015. He directed Part 1 of Allegiant, the two-part finale to the series, with a script by Noah Oppenheim.

Schwentke directed the G.I. Joe spin-off film centered around Snake Eyes, which stars Henry Golding and was released in 2021.

Filmography
Film

Television

See also
Cinema of Germany

References

External links

1968 births
Living people
Film people from Stuttgart
English-language film directors